All These Women, originally released as Now About These Women in the UK, is a 1964 Swedish comedy film directed by Ingmar Bergman. It is a parody of Federico Fellini's 8½. Along with Smiles of a Summer Night, the film is one of the few comedy films ever made by Bergman. It was Bergman's first film to be shot in color.

Plot
Cornelius is a musical critic who visits the summer estate, Villa Tremolo, of the famed cellist, Felix, to write the musician's biography. Cornelius is greeted by Jillker, Felix's impresario, and Tristan, the chauffeur, but Felix himself remains chiefly unseen. Cornelius glimpses Felix heading for a bedroom with a woman whom he presumes to be Felix's wife. Cornelius meets Adelaide and tells her Felix has retired with his wife, but Adelaide reveals she is in fact Felix's wife. It turns out Felix is unfaithful and has several lovers. Aside from Adelaide, each is given a special nickname. The self-proclaimed "official" mistress is Ms. Bumblebee, who meets and has sex with Cornelius.

While Cornelius is in bed with Miss Bumblebee, a woman enters the room with a pistol and fires several shots. No one is harmed, but Cornelius believes the shots were meant for Felix. Cornelius becomes concerned someone is trying to murder Felix and tells Jillker, who is unconcerned, as everyone must die. Cornelius remains unable to meet with Felix and finds it difficult to write a biography without an interview. He tells Adelaide that though the threat of murder might add interest to the biography, he hoped Felix's safety would be guarded.

Jillker, citing Felix's total moral decline, resigns as his impresario. Felix emerges to perform in front of his lovers and Cornelius. During the performance, a woman takes out a pistol. However, Felix collapses, dead, during his performance without any shots fired. Four days after Cornelius' arrival to Villa Tremolo, the lovers, one by one, look over Felix in his coffin, each one remarking on how he looks the same, yet different.

Cast

Release and reception
The film ranked 9th on Cahiers du Cinéma's Top 10 Films of the Year List in 1964. In 2018, The Criterion Collection released the film on Blu-ray in Region A, along with 38 other Bergman films, in the set Ingmar Bergman's Cinema.

Critic Roger Ebert wrote that All These Women was "the worst film he [Bergman] has ever made." Stanley Kauffmann of The New Republic wrote "All These Women is intended to be hilarious, but the gift of splitting sides is not in him [Bergman]".

References

Further reading
Review in LIFE 16 Oct 1964 p. 19

External links 
 
 
 at bergmanorama

1964 films
1960s parody films
Films directed by Ingmar Bergman
Films with screenplays by Ingmar Bergman
Swedish comedy films
1960s Swedish-language films
Films scored by Erik Nordgren
1964 comedy films
1960s Swedish films